Hoosh-e Siah (lit. "Black Intelligence") is a 2010 Iranian TV series. it is directed by Masoud Abparvar. The main theme of the Hoosh-e Siah 1 series is about cyber crime.

The series is set in Iran and Istanbul, Turkey.

Cast
Hossein Yari
Keykavous Yakideh
Kamand Amirsoleimani
Dariush Asadzadeh
Soudabeh Beizaei
Majid Vasheghani as Iman Akbarnezhad (S2)

References

Iranian television series
2010 Iranian television series debuts
2010s Iranian television series